Radoš Šešlija (born 4 February 1992) is a Serbian professional basketball player for Borac Banja Luka of the Championship of Bosnia and Herzegovina and the Second ABA League.

Professional career 
On 8 September 2021, he signed for Borac Banja Luka.

References

External links
 Eurobasket profile
 FIBA profile
 Realgm profile
 aba-liga Profile

1992 births
Living people
ABA League players
Basketball players from Belgrade
Basketball League of Serbia players
Centers (basketball)
KK FMP players
KK Novi Sad players
KK Vojvodina Srbijagas players
OKK Borac players
Serbian expatriate basketball people in Bosnia and Herzegovina
Serbian men's basketball players